Olios hirtus, is a species of spider of the genus Olios. It is endemic to Sri Lanka.

See also
 List of Sparassidae species

References

Spiders described in 1879
Spiders of Asia
Endemic fauna of Sri Lanka
Sparassidae